Chike C. Nwoffiah  (born 22 July 1965 in Nigeria) is a Nigerian filmmaker and arts consultant. He was listed as one of the "Top Ten Most Influential African Americans" in the San Francisco Bay Area by City Flight Magazine in 2000.

Education and career
Nwoffiah was educated at Government College, Umuahia, and the University of Lagos, before moving to the United States to study at the Columbia University Graduate School of Business (INM) and the Hollywood Film Institute.

He was the president of the Rhesus Media Group and executive director of the Oriki Theater, both in California. He was an adjunct faculty member at Menlo College, California. He was the Principal Partner in C3 Media, Abuja, Nigeria. He was the director of the Silicon Valley African Film Festival.

Filmography
 2000: Growing Black in America
 2001: Jamaica - Spirit of Enterprise
 2002: Tantu
 2003: A Jewel in History
 2004: A Killing in Choctaw
 2005: Every Drop Counts
 2006: Bridges
 2007: Wake Up Africa
 2009: A Prayer for the Inauguration
 2009: Sabar - life is a dance!

See also
 List of Nigerian film producers

References

External links
 
https://web.archive.org/web/20090801033222/http://c3media.net/

1965 births
Nigerian film directors
Living people
University of Lagos alumni
21st-century Nigerian male actors
Columbia Business School alumni
Nigerian theatre directors
Government College Umuahia alumni
Igbo actors
Nigerian male television actors
Nigerian film producers